Patricia A. Carpenter is a psychologist who, as of 1997, held the Lee and Marge Gregg Professorship of Psychology at Carnegie Mellon University. Carpenter has studied individual variability in working memory, comprehension rates in speed reading, and how brain function during complex cognitive tasks appears in functional magnetic resonance imaging. With Marcel Just, she coauthored The Psychology of Reading and Language Comprehension (1987).

Education and career
Carpenter earned her Ph.D. in 1972 from Stanford University, and on earning her doctorate joined the Carnegie Mellon University faculty.

Selected publications

References

External links
Patricia Carpenter's Biography - CMU Department of Psychology
Patricia Carpenter's Biography - Center for the Neural Basis of Cognition
Quantum Ontology: Minds, Brains, and Catalysts

American women psychologists
American cognitive neuroscientists
American women neuroscientists
Stanford University alumni
Carnegie Mellon University faculty
Year of birth missing (living people)
Living people